Psalm 53 is the 53rd psalm of the Book of Psalms, beginning in English in the King James Version: "The fool hath said in his heart, There is no God.". In the slightly different numbering system used in the Greek Septuagint and Latin Vulgate translations of the Bible, this psalm is Psalm 52. In Latin, it is known as "Dixit insipiens in corde suo non est deus", It is described as a maskil or "contemplation of David".

The psalm forms a regular part of Jewish, Catholic, Eastern Orthodox and Protestant liturgies.

Text

Hebrew Bible version 
The following is the Hebrew text of Psalm 53:

King James Version 
 The fool hath said in his heart, There is no God. Corrupt are they, and have done abominable iniquity: there is none that doeth good.
 God looked down from heaven upon the children of men, to see if there were any that did understand, that did seek God.
 Every one of them is gone back: they are altogether become filthy; there is none that doeth good, no, not one.
 Have the workers of iniquity no knowledge? who eat up my people as they eat bread: they have not called upon God.
 There were they in great fear, where no fear was: for God hath scattered the bones of him that encampeth against thee: thou hast put them to shame, because God hath despised them.
 Oh that the salvation of Israel were come out of Zion! When God bringeth back the captivity of his people, Jacob shall rejoice, and Israel shall be glad.

Content 
This psalm is the Elohistic Psalter's (Pss. 42–83) version of Psalm 14, and nearly identical to it. The medieval exegete Rashi understood Psalm 14 to refer to the destruction of the First Temple; this version, he thought, refers to the destruction of the Second Temple. Modern interpreters, following Hermann Gunkel's form criticism, classify this psalm as a lament.

There are two differences between Psalms 14 and 53, the name of God used being the first. Psalm 14 uses the covenant name of God, YHWH, typical of the Psalms in book 1 of Psalms (Psalms 1 through 41). Psalm 53 uses Elohim, typical of the Psalms in Book 2 (Psalms 42 through 72). Second, there is reference to "a refuge for the poor" in Psalm 14:6, which is missing from Psalm 53.

Uses

New Testament 
In the New Testament, verses 1–3 are quoted by Paul in Romans , where he argues that Jews and Gentiles are equally in need of God's grace. Since this Psalm and Psalm 14 are nearly identical, it is difficult to tell which one is quoted.

Book of Common Prayer 
In the Church of England's Book of Common Prayer, this psalm is appointed to be read on the evening of the tenth day of the month.

Musical settings 
Heinrich Schütz set Psalm 53 in a metred version in German, "Es spricht der Unweisen Mund wohl", SWV 150, as part of the Becker Psalter, first published in 1628.

References

External links 

 
 
 Text of Psalm 53 according to the 1928 Psalter
 Psalms Chapter 53 text in Hebrew and English, mechon-mamre.org
 For the leader; according to Mahalath. A maskil of David. The fool says in his heart, “There is no God.” text and footnotes, usccb.org United States Conference of Catholic Bishops
 Psalm 53:1 introduction and text, biblestudytools.com
 Psalm 53 – The Faithful God Delivers His People from Fools enduringword.com
 Psalm 53 / Refrain: The fear of the Lord is the beginning of wisdom. Church of England
 Psalm 53 at biblegateway.com
 Hymns for Psalm 53 hymnary.org

053
Works attributed to David